Jin Ju-hyung (born Kim Jin-tae on November 24, 1994) is a South Korean actor. He rose to fame playing the leading role of Lee Han-kyul in the drama series Sunny Again Tomorrow (2018), and has roles in Suspicious Partner (2017).

Career

2013–2016: Beginnings
Jin started acting in 2013 where he played as Detective Goo in Scandal: A Shocking and Wrongful Incident. His second role came in 2014 in blade man and several roles in 2016.

2018–present: First Lead Role
Jin got his first lead role playing as Lee Han-kyul in 2018 Sunny Again Tomorrow.

Filmography

Television series

Music video appearances

Awards and nominations

References

21st-century South Korean male actors
South Korean male television actors
People from Seoul
1994 births
Living people